(English: 'First Mission') is a Czech military television series  which was broadcast on TV Prima from 29 August 2021 to 29 June 2022. It was cancelled after season 1. It was a follow-up to the television series Modrý kód and Sestřičky.

Cast
 Marek Němec as MUDr. David Hofbauer
 Jan Dolanský as plk. MUDr. Daniel Hofman
 Kristýna Leichtová as Mgr. Alice Hofmanová (roz. Jívová)
 Pavel Řezníček as plk. MUDr. Mgr. Vít Jelen
 Igor Chmela as MUDr. Viktor Žák
 Roman Zach as MUDr. Roman "Rasputin" Nikolajev Vilkin
 Vojtěch Efler as MUDr. Karel Vlach
 Adéla Gondíková as Mgr. Michaela Kratochvílová
 Amelie Pokorná Zedníčková as Andrea "Andy" Kratochvílová

References

External links

2021 Czech television series debuts
Czech action television series
Czech drama television series
Czech medical television series
Czech military television series
Prima televize original programming
Sequel television series
Czech television spin-offs